Peñafrancia may refer to the following topics in the Philippines:

 Peñafrancia Basilica, a Roman Catholic church in the city of Naga, Camarines Sur
 Our Lady of Peñafrancia, an image of the Virgin Mary housed in the basilica and patron saint of the city of Naga and the Bicol Region
 Our Lady of Peñafrancia Shrine, a Roman Catholic church in the city of Naga, Camarines Sur and former home of Our Lady of Peñafrancia
 Peñafrancia, Naga, a barangay in the city of Naga, Camarines Sur